Gary Steven Schaer (born September 11, 1951) is an American Democratic Party politician who serves in the New Jersey General Assembly where he represents the 36th Legislative District. He took office on January 10, 2006, and remains on the Passaic, New Jersey City Council where he is the council president. Schaer is the first Orthodox Jew in the New Jersey Legislature. Currently serving as a deputy speaker, and as Chairman of the Budget Committee from 2014 to 2017, Schaer is one of the highest-ranking members of the Assembly.

Biography
Schaer grew up in Pennsauken Township, New Jersey. He attended American University, majoring in political science.

Schaer has served on the Passaic City Council since 1995, including being the council resident off-and-on since 1997. He has been a Director of Passaic's Urban Enterprise Zone since 2002. He served as a Commissioner on the Board of Education for the Passaic County Technical Institute from 1999 to 2003 and was a commissioner on the Passaic Housing Authority from 1992 to 1996.

Schaer unsuccessfully ran for Mayor of Passaic in 1997 finishing behind incumbent Margie Semler and councilman Samuel Rivera. In May 2008, Schaer became the acting mayor of Passaic upon the resignation of Rivera, who had won election to the office in 2001, as a result of Rivera pleading guilty on corruption charges. Though he considered running for the remainder of the term, Schaer declined to seek election to the unexpired term and was succeeded by Alex Blanco.

He is a Trustee of St. Mary's Hospital. Schaer has worked in the financial services industry for over 20 years. He is an investment consultant and vice president at Ryan Beck & Company. A resident of Passaic, he is married to Donna and has three children.

Legislative career
Schaer was elected to the Assembly on November 8, 2005, and took the seat of Republican Paul DiGaetano, who did not run for re-election and had held the seat in the Assembly continuously since 1992. Schaer represents the 36th District, a district consisting of only the City of Passaic in Passaic County in the 2001 and 2011 apportionments, and Bergen County (Nutley in Essex County was part of the district in 2001, while Lyndhurst/North Arlington will be there as of 2022); his predecessor DiGaetano has also been a resident of Passaic. District leaders attempt to provide geographic balance when picking candidates.

Schaer is the first Orthodox Jew to serve in the New Jersey Legislature. In situations in which the legislature is in session on Saturday, the Jewish Sabbath, when the dictates of his Orthodox Jewish faith prohibit him from participating in forbidden forms of work, he has appointed an aide to formally cast a ballot on his behalf, a policy permitted by the Assembly's rules, as long as the legislator is in the building.

From 2014 to 2017, Schaer was the chair of the Assembly Budget Committee. For the 2018-19 session he was assigned to serve in the Assembly on the Appropriations Committee (as Vice-Chair), the Education Committee and the Financial Institutions and Insurance Committee. He holds the Deputy Speaker leadership position in the Assembly, a position he has held since 2012. He has been the Assembly's Policy Chair 2020 since 2020.

Committees 
Committee assignments for the current session are:
Financial Institutions and Insurance, Vice-Chair
Appropriations
Budget

District 36
Each of the 40 districts in the New Jersey Legislature has one representative in the New Jersey Senate and two members in the New Jersey General Assembly. The representatives from the 36th District for the 2022—23 Legislative Session are:
Senator Paul Sarlo (D)
Assemblyman Clinton Calabrese (D)
Assemblyman Gary Schaer (D)

References

External links
Assemblyman Schaer's legislative web page, New Jersey Legislature
New Jersey Legislature financial disclosure forms
2016 2015 2014 2013 2012 2011 2010 2009 2008 2007 2006 2005
New Jersey Democrats legislative candidate biographies

1951 births
Living people
American Orthodox Jews
American University alumni
Jewish mayors of places in the United States
Jewish American state legislators in New Jersey
Mayors of Passaic, New Jersey
Democratic Party members of the New Jersey General Assembly
People from Pennsauken Township, New Jersey
21st-century American politicians
21st-century American Jews